Wai Yuen Ting (born 15 October 1992) is a Hong Kong footballer who plays as a midfielder for Hong Kong Women League club Citizen AA. She is also a futsal player, and represented Hong Kong internationally in both football and futsal.

International career
Wai Yuen Ting has been capped for Hong Kong at senior level in both football and futsal. In football, she represented Hong Kong at two EAFF E-1 Football Championship editions (2017 and 2019), the 2018 AFC Women's Asian Cup qualification, the 2018 Asian Games and the 2020 AFC Women's Olympic Qualifying Tournament.

In futsal, Wai Yuen Ting played for Hong Kong at the 2018 AFC Women's Futsal Championship.

International goals

See also
List of Hong Kong women's international footballers

References

1992 births
Living people
Hong Kong women's futsal players
Hong Kong women's footballers
Women's association football midfielders
Hong Kong women's international footballers